Lääniste is a village in Kastre Parish, Tartu County, Estonia. It is located just southeast of Võnnu, by the Ahja River. In 2000 Lääniste had a population of 134.

References

External links
Unofficial website 
Lääniste blog 

Villages in Tartu County